Oenopota levidensis is a species of sea snail, a marine gastropod mollusk in the family Mangeliidae.

Description
The length of the shell attains 17 mm. Carpenter's types from Neeah Bay and Puget Sound were badly worn, imperfect specimens, hardly identifiable. The color of the fresh shell is dark brown, and the sculpture on the body whorl in older specimens is often more or less obsolete.

Distribution
This marine species occurs in the Salish Sea, Northwest America

References

 Philip Carpenter, Diagnoses Specierum et Varietatum novarum Moluscorum prope sinum Pugetianum; Proceedings of the Academy of Natural Sciences of Philadelphia vol. 17 (1865)
 Carpenter P. (1872) The Mollusks of Western North America, Smithsonian Institution, Washington

External links
  Tucker, J.K. 2004 Catalog of recent and fossil turrids (Mollusca: Gastropoda). Zootaxa 682:1–1295.
  Dall, William Healey. Summary of the marine shellbearing mollusks of the northwest coast of America: from San Diego, California, to the Polar Sea, mostly contained in the collection of the United States National Museum, with illustrations of hitherto unfigured species. No. 112. Govt. print. off., 1921   

levidensis
Gastropods described in 1864
Taxa named by Philip Pearsall Carpenter